The Application Software Systems Laboratory (TASSL) is a research lab, as a part of Center for Advanced Information Processing (CAIP), and Department of Electrical and Computing Engineering at Rutgers University . It is under the direction of Dr. Manish Parashar and the current research fields include Autonomic Computing, Parallel Computing and Distributed Computing, Grid Computing, Peer-to-peer Computing, Adaptive Computing Systems, and Scientific Computation..

It is one of the leading research groups in the field of Autonomic Computing and adaptive computation systems.

External links

 CAIP

Artificial intelligence laboratories
Research institutes in New Jersey
Computer science institutes in the United States
Laboratories in the United States